Verso Recto is an abstract strategy game for one to four players, designed by artist Twagirumukiza Innocent.

Game rules

The game uses a Verso Recto game board and 28 pawns (7 reds, 7 blacks, 7 yellows and 7 blues). Each pawn has a front side and a reverse side. The reverse side is marked by a point.

The first player who places all the pieces side by side, that is to say, so adjacent to each other, wins. One condition to win, all the pawns, joined by the player must be on the same side (either the front or the back).

Each player has seven pawns of the same color. In each round of play, a pawn moves by tilting the front to back or vice versa depending on its position in the empty square which is symmetrical (so eight possible directions).

Awards

The game Verso Recto received the AIFF Medal (French Association of Inventors and manufacturers) at Concours Lépine 2005.

References

External links
Demonstration of a Verso Recto game on YouTube
twagirumukiza.fr

Board games
Abstract strategy games
Children's board games
Party board games